The Satellite Award for Best Cast (or Best Ensemble) – Television Series is one of the Satellite Awards given by the International Press Academy.

Winners

2000s

2010s

2020s

References

Cast Television Series